Qatar–United Arab Emirates football rivalry, is a perspective association football rivalry between two nations, Qatar and the United Arab Emirates, involving football teams of both nations.

The two nations' rivalry has begun since 1972, however, their rivalry had been largely friendly at first and both Qatar and the United Arab Emirates had no issue facing each other. Beginning in 2017, due to the Qatar diplomatic crisis and the downturn of relations, poor political relations have managed to affect football development, causing the rivalry to gain importance.

History
Qatar and the United Arab Emirates had been largely friendly football rivals when the two first met in 1972, a year after independence from Britain. The two countries first met in the 2nd Arabian Gulf Cup, where Qatar lost to the United Arab Emirates 0–1. Since then, the two nations have met in other 30 occasions. However, only two games happened as friendlies, both ended with Emirati victories.

The rivalry was initially insignificant until 2017 when the United Arab Emirates actively participated in the Qatar diplomatic crisis, by blockading Qatar in air, land and naval travels. Since then, the rivalry has headed into a more hostile fervor; in 2018 AFC U-19 Championship, captain of the U-19 United Arab Emirates refused to shake hand with the Qatari counterpart, Qatar lost the game 1–2 but eventually the one to qualify for the 2019 FIFA U-20 World Cup while the United Arab Emirates was eliminated instead.

Attempt to separate politics from football proved fruitless, when in 2019 AFC Asian Cup, despite effort to reduce tensions, the United Arab Emirates still banned Qataris from entering the country for the tournament. Even Qatari officials were also prohibited from entering the country to inspect the perpetration for the competition. Further, in the semi-finals game between two countries, Prince Nahyan bin Zayed Al Nahyan decided to buy all the remaining tickets of the match to distribute for home fans, as a way to cheer the spirit of the United Arab Emirates, meaning that Qatar had to face an entirely hostile crowd. This had generated controversy as the United Arab Emirates were attempting to politicize the match, given the earlier crisis in the relations between two countries. Despite this, Qatar emerged victoriously with a resounding 4–0 victory on its eventual conquest of the tournament, which was the biggest victory for either of them in their head-to-head history at the time.

Matches
Source:

Overall summary

Top scorers
The bold indicates that the player is still active

See also 
 Qatar–United Arab Emirates relations
 Qatar diplomatic crisis

References

Qatar national football team
United Arab Emirates national football team
Qatar–United Arab Emirates relations
International association football rivalries
Politics and sports